Cyttaria hariotii is an edible mushroom commonly called llao llao, llaullao and pan de indio. The fungus, found in Patagonia, southern Chile and Argentina, is parasitic on Nothofagus (Southern beech) trees. The fungus affects its hosts internally in its sap ducts; the tree defends itself by generating galls to bypass the sap blockages. The fungus expands out of the gall to other parts of the tree. That grows in the branches of the trees as if it was a fruit. This one is a great eatable mushroom of sweet flavor with which desserts, sweets and even icecreams are made.

References

 Flora del Archipiélago Fueguino y Patagonia, 2nd Edition, Buenos Aires, 2006, 
 Patagonia and Antarctica, Life and Color, María Luisa Petraglia de Bozón y Norberto Domingo de Bolzón, Buenos Aires, 2005, 
 Alfonso, J. 1938. Los Bosques de Tierra del Fuego. En: Revista Dirección Nacional de Bosques, N°47, Vol I:115-119 
 Guerrido C. & Fernández D., 2007, Flora Patagonia, Fantástico Sur, 
 Rothkugel, M. 1916; Los Bosques Patagónicos. Ministerio de Agricultura. Buenos Aires

External links

Leotiomycetes
Fungi of South America
Edible fungi
Parasitic fungi
Ecology of Patagonia
Fungi described in 1888